Laxmi Nagar, is the central location and focal point for east Delhi area. Earlier, it was one of the most inhabited cities, known as Trans Yam 

una (Laksmi Nagar). It has become a popular shopping area for garments, and day to day staple items. 

Akshardham temple is around 3 km from Laxmi Nagar.

Laxmi Nagar is popularly known for being the central location for the majority of Coaching centers associated with the Chartered Accountancy Course offered by Institute of Chartered Accountants of India , Cost and Management Accountant ( Institute of Cost Accountant of India) and also for the Company Secretary course offered by Institute of Company Secretaries of India.

Abhay Verma from BJP is the current MLA (Member Of Legislative Assembly) from Laxmi Nagar.

Major Schools
Government Sarvodaya Bal / Kanya Vidyalaya, Laxmi Nagar
Bharti Public School, Swasthya Vihar
Vidya Bal Bhawan Public School
Sneh International School
Jagdish Bal Mandir Public School
Lovely Public School 
Bal Bhavan Public School
SLS DAV Public School
Amar Jeevan Public School
First Step Learning School
AVB Public school
Vardhman Shiksha Niketan
Andhra Education Society School
Ryan International School
GGSSS
RSKV ( Rashtriya Sarvodya Kanya Vidyalaya)

Malls
V3S Mall
Cinepolis (Fun Cinemas is replaced by Cinepolis)
Radhu Palace (only for wine and chicken shop)

Parks
Vishwakarma Park
Lalita Park
Tikona Park
Ramesh Park
Jagat Ram Park
Sanjay Park
Gyan Kunj Park
DDA sports Ground Bank Enclave

Nearby Metro Station
Akshardhaam Metro
Laxmi Nagar Metro Station
Nirman Vihar Metro Station
Yamuna Bank Metro Station
Preet Vihar Metro Station
Indraprasth Metro Station

Nearby Colonies
Preet Vihar
Nirman Vihar
Pandav Nagar
Patparganj
Mayur Vihar
Shakarpur
Khureji khas
Mandawali
Ganesh nagar
Geeta colony
Gandhi Nagar
Kundan Nagar
Bank Enclave
Sukh Vihar

References

 http://eastdelhiupdate.com East Delhi Updates
Dental Clinic in Laxmi Nagar Dental Clinic Laxmi Nagar

Neighbourhoods in Delhi